The Bali Duck (also known as the Balinese Crested Duck or Crested Runner Duck) is a lightweight breed of domesticated duck raised primarily for decoration or as pets, although they are good layers. It is similar to the Indian Runner Duck, differing only in having a crest on the top of the head. 

The Bali Duck weighs around 2.25–2.75 kg (5–6 lb) with a slender, upright body. The body carriage is not as varied as that of the Indian Runner: Balis tend to vary between carrying their body at angle of 60–70 degrees to the ground whereas Indian Runners can be anywhere in the range of 45–75 degrees. The Bali has wider shoulders and heavier-set body than the Indian Runner, and a coarser head and bill shape. It can be clearly distinguished by the crest on the top of its head.

The Bali Duck comes in a variety of standard colours, but the most common are white, brown and a Mallard colouring. It produces 120–250 eggs a year.  These eggs are blue-green to white in colour.

The Bali Duck is one of the oldest breeds of domestic duck. It is uncommon outside of Bali, and has not achieved the same success as the Indian Runner. Although it is a good layer, it has not been the subject of selective breeding for egg production (as the Indian Runner has), possibly because of the high in ovo mortality rate. The same gene responsible for producing the crest codes for a number of defects including back and balance problems, arched necks and complications in the formation of the skull that lead to death before hatching. On average one of every three offspring which survive hatching will lack the crest. A quarter of ducklings are killed by the lethal double-dose of the crested gene (which results in severe skull deformities) either before hatching, or soon after. The method routinely used in Bali for producing the largest number of viable ducks is to cross crested and non-crested specimens — this results in a higher survival rate, and the number of crested offspring will statistically be 50%.

Notes

References

Duck breeds
Duck breeds originating in Indonesia